Uterine adenosarcoma is an uncommon form of cancer that arises from mesenchymal tissue of the uterus and has a benign glandular component.

Signs and symptoms
The most common presentation is vaginal bleeding. Other presentations include pelvic mass and uterine polyp. Generally, the clinical findings are non-specific.

Pathology
Uterine adenosarcoma have, by definition, a malignant stroma and benign glandular elements. The World Health Organization (WHO) criteria have a mitotic rate cut point; however, this is often disregarded, as bland-appearing tumours with a low mitotic rate are known to metastasize occasionally.

Treatment
Uterine adenosarcomas are typically treated with a total abdominal hysterectomy and bilateral salpingoophorectomy (TAH-BSO).  Ovary-sparing surgery may be done in women wishing to preserve fertility.

Prognosis
The prognosis is determined primarily by the cancer stage. Most tumours are discovered at an early stage and have a good prognosis, especially when compared to uterine carcinosarcoma. Five-year survival for stage I and stage III tumours is approximately 80% and 50% respectively.

See also
Carcinosarcoma
Sarcoma

References

External links 

Gynaecological cancer